A Coastal reservoir is a type of reservoir to store fresh water on sea coast area near a river delta. Saemanguem in South Korea, Marina Barrage in Singapore, Qingcaosha and Plover Cove in China, Delta Works in Netherlands, and Thanneermukkom Bund in India are a few existing coastal reservoirs.

Advantages
Unlike land-based water reservoirs, there is no land submergence in the case of coastal reservoirs. They store water without disturbing people and natural habitat by replacing standing salt water on the sea area by river flood water. The coastal reservoir area is separated from the sea by building earth dikes by dredging. Water is pumped from these reservoirs for irrigation, municipal and industrial purposes. Sometimes used for flood control and land reclamation from the sea coast. The social and environmental impacts of coastal reservoirs are negligible compared to land-based water reservoirs. The construction cost is a few times less than the cost of land-based reservoirs since there is no expenditure for acquiring the vast land area, the submerged immovable properties and the rehabilitation of displaced people. The sea side of the coastal reservoir can also be used for locating the deep sea harbor.

Construction

The coastal reservoir's earth dikes extending up to 8 m msl high, is in the form of two parallel dikes separated by 1000 meters gap. The main purpose of the twin dikes is to prevent any sea water seepage into coastal reservoirs as its water level is below the sea water level. The water level between the dikes is always maintained up to 2 m above sea level by pumping fresh water from the coastal reservoir to the 1000 m gap between the dikes. The higher level freshwater barrier between the two dikes fully eliminates any sea water seepage into the coastal reservoir by establishing freshwater seepage to the sea. The rainwater falling on the coastal reservoir area and the runoff water from the catchment area of its minor coastal rivers are adequate to cater to the seepage and evaporation losses from the coastal reservoir. The 1000 m gap between the two dikes is also used as deep water mega harbor for shipping, ship breaking, shipbuilding, safe berthing of crude oil, LPG, LNG, etc. ships with floating storage options, etc. For shipping purposes, the breakwater outer dike facing the sea is envisaged with a few locks fitted with twin gates for access to the open sea. The top surface of the inner dike would serve as access to the mainland from the mega harbor with rail and road links. The coastal reservoir whose full reservoir water level (FRL) is at 0.0 m MSL, would also drastically reduce the cyclone damage and flooding in coastal areas. It would also greatly improve the irrigated coastal lands drainage. The dikes of coastal reservoirs would also reclaim coastal lands by giving protection from tsunamis, storm surges and tidal bores. The coastal reservoir area can also be used for locating floating solar power plants to generate the needed water pumping power. Also top surface of the inner dike of the coastal reservoirs can be used as transnational highways & railways. Coastal reservoirs are truly multi-purpose infrastructure projects with shipping & transport, land reclamation, irrigation, renewable power generation, etc. facilities.

The dikes are built by dredging sand and clay from the nearby shallow sea bed using dredgers fueled by LNG or Hydrogen fuel cells or battery power to reduce the construction cost. Major river water would be diverted in a controlled manner to the coastal reservoirs from their delta channels or by flood flow canals by constructing barrages across the major rivers. Their excessive flood flows are directly routed to the sea. The coastal reservoirs located on either side of a major river course/path are interconnected by submarine ducts/pipes of suitable length. Wherever existing ports/waterways and famous beach resorts are to be preserved, the long coastal reservoir is broken into parts and interconnected by submarine ducts of suitable length. During lean flow periods, minimum environmental flows would be maintained in medium and major rivers up to sea by letting water into the sea directly or via submarine ducts of suitable length. It would also prevent deterioration of water quality in coastal reservoirs by preventing the inflow of inferior quality river waters with higher salt load. For inland shipping, the deep water ports (1000 m wide) would be connected with locks arrangement to the major rivers via delta channels and to the adjacent coastal reservoir. Fish migration to and fro to the sea or rivers is possible as the rivers are not completely blocked. Navigation paths from sea to the river via deep sea port will also serve as fish migration routes. However the negative aspects of these man-made lagoons are to be evaluated in detail and proper remedial steps shall be incorporated to minimize the damage to the coastal ecosystem by the presence of freshwater lagoon as a barrier to the sea.

Proposed projects
There are vast deserts on all continents (western part of South America, northern and southwestern Africa, middle east in Asia, southwestern part of USA, Australia, etc.) and also water surplus regions nearer to these deserts. It is technically and economically feasible to construct man-made freshwater coastal reservoirs/lagoons on the continental shelf of the sea up to 20 meters depth from the coastline to supply fresh water to desert areas from nearby water surplus/high rainfall areas. Excess water from the high rainfall regions will be collected in the coastal reservoirs at sea level and this fresh water is pumped to irrigate desert lands from the other end of the lengthy coastal reservoirs. In other words, the proposal is interconnecting rivers with a sea level / sub-sea level contour canal (at least five km wide) to facilitate water transfer.

The following are the proposed projects:

 The Reber plan involved damming the San Francisco Bay near the Golden Gate, in order to transform the San Francisco Bay into a giant freshwater reservoir that could be used to provide potable water and irrigation for the entire state of California.
 Hangzhou Bay area in south eastern China can be used for a coastal reservoir to store flood water of Yangtze River for the needs of agriculture, city water supply, etc. in entire China.  
 Water transfer from the west central Africa (Congo River basin, etc.) to Northern Africa (Sahara desert) and South West Africa (Namibia and South Africa deserts)
 Water transfer from the south east Africa (Zambezi River basin, etc.) to North east Africa (Somalia, Ethiopia, Sudan, Egypt, etc.). 
 Water transfer from the northern part of the South America continent from Venezuela, Colombia and Panama to desert lands of Chile and Peru by interconnecting Atrato and Tuira rivers to lift/transfer water from the side of Atlantic Ocean to the Pacific Ocean. 
 Water transfer from Fly, Kikori, Purari, etc. rivers of the Papua New Guinea island to Northern Australia by blocking the shallow depth sea of Torres Strait between southern Papua New Guinea and Northern tip of Australia. For navigation purposes, a freshwater sea level navigation channel (20 m water depth and 500 m wide) is provided with locks at the entry to the sea to cross the coastal reservoir which is blocking the Torres Strait. The divided coastal reservoir into two parts is connected by underpass water tunnels for water transport.
 Water transfer from the north and south coastal areas of the western 'North America continent' to the southwestern region of the United States and central parts of Mexico.
 East to west Water transfer from a  coastal reservoir on the Bay of Bengal sea to water deficit parts of India from  Ganga and Bramhaputra flood waters.
 Water transfer from  Andhra Pradesh state in India from Krishna and Godavari rivers flood waters to Tamil Nadu state in India with a coastal reservoir on Bay of Bengal sea.
 Water transfer from India and Sri Lanka to Pakistan and Iran with lengthy coastal reservoir on Arabian sea along the west coast of India from Rameshwaram to Strait of Hormuz.

The above gigantic coastal reservoir projects would cover most of the desert areas of the world except the high lands of central Asian deserts. Water needs of these areas can be fully met by diverting water of Siberian rivers. Thus most of the lands which are not available for cultivation and forestry can be turned in to a habitat to copious greenery which would help to mitigate the global warming process. With the advent of cheap renewable energy like solar and wind power, availability of energy sources is not an ongoing issue but water availability is still a major issue that can be solved by coastal reservoirs to a major extent.

See also

 List of rivers by discharge
 List of largest unfragmented rivers
 Polavaram Project
 Pollution of the Ganges
 Water export

References

Reservoirs
Lakes by type
 
Bodies of water